Stenosturmia is a genus of parasitic flies in the family Tachinidae. There are at least two described species in Stenosturmia.

Species
These two species belong to the genus Stenosturmia:
 Stenosturmia peruana Townsend, 1929
 Stenosturmia stricta Townsend, 1927

References

Further reading

 
 
 
 

Tachinidae
Articles created by Qbugbot